The Broken Hearts Gallery is a 2020 romantic comedy film written and directed by Natalie Krinsky, in her directorial debut. Executive produced by Selena Gomez, the film stars Geraldine Viswanathan, Dacre Montgomery, Utkarsh Ambudkar, Molly Gordon, Phillipa Soo and Bernadette Peters. The plot follows a 20-something in New York City who gets dumped by her latest boyfriend and creates an art gallery to display items from people's previous relationships. The film was theatrically released in the United States on September 11, 2020, to generally positive reviews from critics.

Plot 
Lucy is a young assistant at the Woolf Gallery in NYC. Idolizing her boss, Eva Woolf, she readily provides info about her to her boyfriend and work colleague, Max. Her friends and roommates, law student Amanda and model Nadine, hear her talking non-stop about him. At the gallery opening, instead of Max asking her to move in, she is both dumped for his ex Amelia and fired.

Drunk and despondent, Lucy climbs into a guy’s car, believing it’s her Lyft, the kind Nick takes her home. On the way, she describes the gallery fiasco. For weeks, she wallows in her room, with her roommates’ support. Finally, they urge her to clear out her cave of memorabilia from past relationships. Unable to sell her mementos, Lucy follows Max and Amelia into a restaurant, Nick sees her, steering her outside before she can cause a scene.

Lucy and Nick end up at the Chloe hotel, an old YMCA. Renovating his dream boutique hotel for five years, he is out of money and needs help to keep the project going. He encourages her to hang Max’s tie on an old nail. Inspired, she writes a caption, and they jointly come up with the concept of Broken Heart Gallery.

Nick shows up at Lucy’s, inviting her to see something added to the wall. Excited, she envisions a chance for New Yorkers to connect over shared loss and humanity. Meeting and bonding with Marcos, Nick’s friend on the building project, they convince Nick to give her gallery space in exchange for work.

Lucy shares photos with their stories on social media #BROKENHEARTGALLERY, then posts short videos of people parting with their memorabilia. She sees first-hand how freeing it is for people to give up their baggage.

Seeking furniture and decorations for the gallery-hotel, they pound the streets, reclaiming pieces as they go. On the way, they chat about themselves. The money to start the hotel came from his grandma’s inheritance. Lucy’s mom sees art everywhere. Browsing in a secondhand-book shop, Lucy sees Max, follows him to a café, and meets Amelia. Nick rescues her again, saying they’re off to a meeting about their hot new gallery. They leave, Max looking intrigued.

Alone one day in the hotel-gallery, a cold, blonde woman looking for Nick, declines to leave a message. Shortly thereafter, the three roommates invite Nick, Marco and his wife to a karaoke night birthday bash. Lucy shows Nick New York Magazine mentioning their project, and she tells him about her idea for a ball opening, inviting influencers. They sing a ‘Don’t Go Breaking My Heart’ duet, Marco (like her roommates) suggests Nick ask her out.

Arriving home at 3 am, they find Max out front. After railing on him in Lucy’s defense, Amanda and Nadine head up. Max is telling her he wants her back when Nick shows up with birthday cake and the men butt heads. She and Max stay out, talking, and she agrees to a lunch.

As Nick’s loan falls through, he tells her to rehome her exhibit, so Lucy approaches every gallery she knows. At lunch with Max, he suggests Eva Woolf, who surprisingly offers gallery space. Seemingly about to take it, as she and Max leave together, she has an epiphany. She asks Nadine for help in breaking up with him. He tells her Amelia dumped him, and she concludes that they were not meant to be together, as she’s the hero in his love story, and he’s the villain in hers. Telling Nick, he also has the backing and the loan. They all work to get the opening ready.

Once finished, Lucy opens up to Nick, introducing him to her mom Cheryl, in a home due to dementia, the person she always sends voicemails to. Later on, they are intimate. Then Chloe appears (the cold woman from weeks ago), Lucy realises, then leaves hurt. Finding her, he explains he hadn’t changed the name for the cost, and he won’t be at the opening.

Eva Woolf’s contributes, as she wants to empower others, donating the box of the wedding ring used to fund her gallery saying, ‘Pain is inevitable. It’s what you do with it that matters.’

Marco and his wife find Nick before the opening, who claims to be ill. Marco tells him it’s heartbreak, and that Lucy got his backer and loan approved. During her opening speech, Nick bursts in with a neon sign, with the new name, The Broken Hearts Hotel. Professing his love, she descends from the balcony, kissing him and tells him she reciprocates his love.

Cast

 Geraldine Viswanathan as Lucy Gulliver
 Dacre Montgomery as Nick Danielson
 Utkarsh Ambudkar as Max Vora
 Molly Gordon as Amanda
 Phillipa Soo as Nadine
 Bernadette Peters as Eva Woolf
 Arturo Castro as Marcos
 Suki Waterhouse as Chloe
 Ego Nwodim as Harvard
 Taylor Hill as Taylor
 Roy Choi as himself
 Megan Ferguson as Randy
 Tattiawna Jones as Dr. Amelia Black
 Nathan Dales as Jeff

Production
In May 2019, it was announced that Geraldine Viswanathan, Dacre Montgomery and Utkarsh Ambudkar had joined the cast of the film, then titled The Broken Heart Gallery, with Natalie Krinsky directing from a screenplay she wrote. Selena Gomez serves as an executive producer under her July Moon Productions banner. In September 2019, it was announced Molly Gordon, Suki Waterhouse, Phillipa Soo, Arturo Castro and Bernadette Peters had joined the cast of the film.

Principal photography began in Toronto, Canada in July 2019. Filming also took place in New York City and wrapped in late-August.

Release
In June 2020, TriStar Pictures and Stage 6 Films acquired distribution rights to the film, and set it for a July 10, 2020, release. It was then delayed to July 17, and then again to August 7, 2020, due to the COVID-19 pandemic. However it was later pulled from the schedule, eventually being scheduled for a September 11, 2020 release. The film premiered on the Sony Pictures Studios lot as part of the company's ongoing "Drive-In Experience" event.

Reception

Box office 
In its opening weekend, The Broken Hearts Gallery grossed $1.1 million from 2,024 theaters, finishing fourth. The film fell 30% in its second weekend, grossing $800,000, then made $470,000 its third weekend.

Critical response 
The website's critics consensus reads: "The Broken Hearts Gallery is a rom-com with few surprises, but plenty of charm – led by a performance from Geraldine Viswanathan that's easy to love." On Metacritic, the film has a weighted average score of 57 out of 100, based on 21 critics, indicating "mixed or average reviews". Audiences polled by CinemaScore gave the film an average grade of "B" on an A+ to F scale, while PostTrak reported 77% of filmgoers gave it a positive score.

Ryan Lattanzio of IndieWire gave the film a "B−" grade praised Viswanathan's performance as "totally winning" and wrote: "The Broken Hearts Gallery is pure glossy fantasy, though Viswanathan's puckish and self-deprecating performance suggests a greater mess waiting to break out of this slick offering. (For all its sleekness, Alar Kivilo's cinematography deftly captures the patchwork textures of Brooklyn.)"

References

External links
 
 
 The Broken Hearts Gallery at Library and Archives Canada

2020 films
2020 romantic comedy films
American romantic comedy films
Canadian romantic comedy films
Films postponed due to the COVID-19 pandemic
Films set in New York City
Films shot in New York City
Films shot in Toronto
Stage 6 Films films
TriStar Pictures films
English-language Canadian films
2020s English-language films
2020 directorial debut films
2020s Canadian films
2020s American films